Marc Gagnon (born May 24, 1975) is a Canadian former short track speed skater. He is a four-time Overall World Champion for 1993, 1994, 1996 and 1998, and winner of three Olympic gold medals.

Biography
Born in Chicoutimi, Quebec, Gagnon started his Olympic career in 1994, when he had already won the 1993 World Championships. He won a bronze in the 1000 m event. Four years later, in Nagano, Japan, Gagnon won a gold medal with the Canadian relay team. The 2002 Salt Lake City Games proved to be Gagnon's best Olympics, with a total of three medals. A bronze in the inaugural 1500 m event, and two golds; in the 500 m and again as a part of the relay team. Even his disqualification in the 1000 m was memorable, as it was the first of an improbable series of events that led to Australian Steven Bradbury winning arguably the most unlikely gold medal in Olympic history.

Winning a total of five medals in three consecutive Winter Games made him the most decorated Canadian athlete in Winter Olympic history until 2006. He has now been overtaken by long track speed skater Cindy Klassen, long track speed skater/road cyclist Clara Hughes and short track speed skater Charles Hamelin, who each have a total of 6 medals. Tied with track and field athlete Phil Edwards and fellow short track  speed skater François-Louis Tremblay, he is one of the five most decorated Canadian athletes in all Olympic Games.

Gagnon won his World Championships in 1993, 1994, 1996 and 1998. He is the first man to have become a four-time Overall World Champion. In addition, he finished 2nd twice, and third once.

In 2007, Gagnon was inducted into the Canadian Olympic Hall of Fame and inducted into Canada's Sports Hall of Fame in 2008.

References

External links 
 
 
 
 

1975 births
Living people
Canadian male speed skaters
Canadian male short track speed skaters
Olympic gold medalists for Canada
Olympic bronze medalists for Canada
Olympic short track speed skaters of Canada
Olympic medalists in short track speed skating
Short track speed skaters at the 1994 Winter Olympics
Short track speed skaters at the 1998 Winter Olympics
Short track speed skaters at the 2002 Winter Olympics
Medalists at the 1994 Winter Olympics
Medalists at the 1998 Winter Olympics
Medalists at the 2002 Winter Olympics
French Quebecers
Sportspeople from Saguenay, Quebec
20th-century Canadian people